Savoyard refers to:

Regional and political
 Savoyard dialect, a Franco-Provençal language
 Savoyard League, a political party based in the Savoy region of France
 A member of the House of Savoy, the ruling dynasty of the Duchy of Savoy, a medieval and early modern state
 Savoyard state, collective term for states ruled by the Duke of Savoy
 A resident of Savoie, a department in France
 A resident of Haute-Savoie, a department in France

The arts
 American Savoyards, a former light opera company
 Washington Savoyards, a former light opera company
 Fans of the Savoy operas
 Members of the D'Oyly Carte Opera Company, which performed at the Savoy Theatre
 The Savoyard, the former magazine of the D'Oyly Carte Opera Company

Other uses
 Savoyard (grape), an Italian wine grape also known as the Dolcetto
 Savoyard Centre, an office building in Detroit, Michigan

See also
 
 Savoy (disambiguation)